Carpophilus hemipterus, the dried-fruit beetle, is a species of sap-feeding beetle in the family Nitidulidae. It is found in North America, Oceania, and Europe.

References

Further reading

External links

 

Nitidulidae
Articles created by Qbugbot
Beetles described in 1758
Taxa named by Carl Linnaeus